Drosophila is a genus of flies, belonging to the family Drosophilidae, whose members are often called "small fruit flies" or (less frequently) pomace flies, vinegar flies, or wine flies, a reference to the characteristic of many species to linger around overripe or rotting fruit. They should not be confused with the Tephritidae, a related family, which are also called fruit flies (sometimes referred to as "true fruit flies"); tephritids feed primarily on unripe or ripe fruit, with many species being regarded as destructive agricultural pests, especially the Mediterranean fruit fly.

One species of Drosophila in particular, D. melanogaster, has been heavily used in research in genetics and is a common model organism in developmental biology. The terms "fruit fly" and "Drosophila" are often used synonymously with D. melanogaster in modern biological literature. The entire genus, however, contains more than 1,500 species and is very diverse in appearance, behavior, and breeding habitat.

Etymology

Morphology
Drosophila species are small flies, typically pale yellow to reddish brown to black, with red eyes. When the eyes (essentially a film of lenses) are removed, the brain is revealed. Drosophila brain structure and function develop and age significantly from larval to adult stage. Developing brain structures make these flies a prime candidate for neuro-genetic research. Many species, including the noted Hawaiian picture-wings, have distinct black patterns on the wings. The plumose (feathery) arista, bristling of the head and thorax, and wing venation are characters used to diagnose the family.

Evolution

Detoxification mechanisms
Environmental challenge by natural toxins helped to prepare Drosophilae to detox DDT, by shaping the glutathione S-transferase mechanism that metabolizes both.

Selection
The Drosophila genome is subject to a high degree of selection, especially unusually widespread negative selection compared to other taxa. A majority of the genome is under selection of some sort, and a supermajority of this is occurring in non-coding DNA.

Effective population size has been credibly suggested to positively correlate with the effect size of both negative and positive selection. Recombination is likely to be a significant source of diversity. There is evidence that crossover is positively correlated with polymorphism in D. populations.

Biology

Habitat
Drosophila species are found all around the world, with more species in the tropical regions. Drosophila made their way to the Hawaiian Islands and radiated into over 800 species. They can be found in deserts, tropical rainforest, cities, swamps, and alpine zones. Some northern species hibernate. The northern species D. montana is the best cold-adapted, and is primarily found at high altitudes. Most species breed in various kinds of decaying plant and fungal material, including fruit, bark, slime fluxes, flowers, and mushrooms. The larvae of at least one species, D. suzukii, can also feed in fresh fruit and can sometimes be a pest. A few species have switched to being parasites or predators. Many species can be attracted to baits of fermented bananas or mushrooms, but others are not attracted to any kind of baits. Males may congregate at patches of suitable breeding substrate to compete for the females, or form leks, conducting courtship in an area separate from breeding sites.

Several Drosophila species, including Drosophila melanogaster, D. immigrans, and D. simulans, are closely associated with humans, and are often referred to as domestic species. These and other species (D. subobscura, and from a related genus Zaprionus indianus) have been accidentally introduced around the world by human activities such as fruit transports.

Reproduction
The cells mostly consist of a long, thread-like tail, and are delivered to the females in tangled coils. The other members of the genus Drosophila also make relatively few giant sperm cells, with that of D. bifurca being the longest. D. melanogaster sperm cells are a more modest 1.8 mm long, although this is still about 35 times longer than a human sperm. Several species in the D. melanogaster species group are known to mate by traumatic insemination.

Drosophila species vary widely in their reproductive capacity. Those such as D. melanogaster that breed in large, relatively rare resources have ovaries that mature 10–20 eggs at a time, so that they can be laid together on one site. Others that breed in more-abundant but less nutritious substrates, such as leaves, may only lay one egg per day. The eggs have one or more respiratory filaments near the anterior end; the tips of these extend above the surface and allow oxygen to reach the embryo. Larvae feed not on the vegetable matter itself, but on the yeasts and microorganisms present on the decaying breeding substrate. Development time varies widely between species (between 7 and more than 60 days) and depends on the environmental factors such as temperature, breeding substrate, and crowding.

Fruit flies lay eggs in response to environmental cycles. Eggs laid at a time (e.g., night) during which likelihood of survival is greater than in eggs laid at other times (e.g., day) yield more larvae than eggs that were laid at those times. Ceteris paribus, the habit of laying eggs at this 'advantageous' time would yield more surviving offspring, and more grandchildren, than the habit of laying eggs during other times. This differential reproductive success would cause D. melanogaster to adapt to environmental cycles, because this behavior has a major reproductive advantage.

Their median lifespan is 35–45 days.

Mating systems

Courtship behavior 

The following section is based on the following Drosophila species: Drosophila simulans and Drosophila melanogaster.
 
Courtship behavior of male Drosophila is an attractive behaviour. Females respond via their perception of the behavior portrayed by the male. Male and female Drosophila use a variety of sensory cues to initiate and assess courtship readiness of a potential mate. The cues include the following behaviours: positioning, pheromone secretion, following females, making tapping sounds with legs, singing, wing spreading, creating wing vibrations, genitalia licking, bending the stomach, attempt to copulate, and the copulatory act itself. The songs of Drosophila melanogaster and Drosophila simulans have been studied extensively. These luring songs are sinusoidal in nature and varies within and between species.

The courtship behavior of Drosophila melanogaster has also been assessed for sex-related genes, which have been implicated in courtship behavior in both the male and female. Recent experiments explore the role of fruitless (fru) and doublesex (dsx), a group of sex-behaviour linked genes.

The fruitless (fru) gene in Drosophila helps regulate the network for male courtship behavior; when a mutation to this gene occurs altered same sex sexual behavior in males is observed. Male Drosophila with the fru mutation direct their courtship towards other males as opposed to typical courtship, which would be directed towards females. Loss of the fru mutation leads back to the typical courtship behavior.

Pheromones

A novel class of pheromones was found to be conserved across the subgenus Drosophila in 11 desert dwelling species.  These pheromones are triacylglycerides that are secreted exclusively by males from their ejaculatory bulb and transferred to females during mating.  The function of the pheromones is to make the females unattractive to subsequent suitors and thus inhibit courtship by other males.

Polyandry

The following section is based on the following Drosophila species: Drosophila serrata, Drosophila pseudoobscura, Drosophila melanogaster, and Drosophila neotestacea. Polyandry is a prominent mating system among Drosophila. Females mating with multiple sex partners has been a beneficial mating strategy for Drosophila. The benefits include both pre and post copulatory mating. Pre-copulatory strategies are the behaviours associated with mate choice and the genetic contributions, such as production of gametes, that are exhibited by both male and female Drosophila regarding mate choice. Post copulatory strategies include sperm competition, mating frequency, and sex-ratio meiotic drive.

These lists are not inclusive. Polyandry among the Drosophila pseudoobscura in North America vary in their number of mating partners.  There is a connection between the number of time females choose to mate and chromosomal variants of the third chromosome. It is believed that the presence of the inverted polymorphism is why re-mating by females occurs. The stability of these polymorphisms may be related to the sex-ratio meiotic drive.

However, for Drosophila subobscura, the main mating system is monandry, not normally seen in Drosophila.

Sperm competition

The following section is based on the following Drosophila species: Drosophila melanogaster, Drosophila simulans, and Drosophila mauritiana. Sperm competition is a process that polyandrous Drosophila females use to increase the fitness of their offspring. The female Drosophila has two sperm storage organs, the spermathecae and seminal receptacle, that allows her to choose the sperm that will be used to inseminate her eggs. However, some species of Drosophila have evolved to only use one or the other. Females have little control when it comes to cryptic female choice. Female Drosophila through cryptic choice, one of several post-copulatory mechanisms, which allows for the detection and expelling of sperm that reduces inbreeding possibilities. Manier et al. 2013 has categorized the post copulatory sexual selection of Drosophila melanogaster, Drosophila simulans, and Drosophila mauritiana into the following three stages: insemination, sperm storage, and fertilizable sperm. Among the preceding species there are variations at each stage that play a role in the natural selection process. This sperm competition has been found to be a driving force in the establishment of reproductive isolation during speciation.

Laboratory-cultured animals
D. melanogaster is a popular experimental animal because it is easily cultured en masse out of the wild, has a short generation time, and mutant animals are readily obtainable. In 1906, Thomas Hunt Morgan began his work on D. melanogaster and reported his first finding of a white eyed mutant in 1910 to the academic community. He was in search of a model organism to study genetic heredity and required a species that could randomly acquire genetic mutation that would visibly manifest as morphological changes in the adult animal. His work on Drosophila earned him the 1933 Nobel Prize in Medicine for identifying chromosomes as the vector of inheritance for genes. This and other Drosophila species are widely used in studies of genetics, embryogenesis, chronobiology, speciation, neurobiology, and other areas.

However, some species of Drosophila are difficult to culture in the laboratory, often because they breed on a single specific host in the wild. For some, it can be done with particular recipes for rearing media, or by introducing chemicals such as sterols that are found in the natural host; for others, it is (so far) impossible. In some cases, the larvae can develop on normal Drosophila lab medium, but the female will not lay eggs; for these it is often simply a matter of putting in a small piece of the natural host to receive the eggs.

The Drosophila Species Stock Center located at Cornell University in Ithaca, New York, maintains cultures of hundreds of species for researchers.

Use in genetic research 
Drosophila is considered one of the most impeccable genetic model organisms - they have furthered genetic research unlike any other model organisms. Both adults and embryos are experimental models. Drosophila is a prime candidate for genetic research because the relationship between human and fruit fly genes is very close. Human and fruit fly genes are so similar, that disease-producing genes in humans can be linked to those in flies. The fly has approximately 15,500 genes on its four chromosomes, whereas humans have about 22,000 genes among their 23 chromosomes. Thus the density of genes per chromosome in Drosophila is higher than the human genome. Low and manageable number of chromosomes make Drosophila species easier to study. These flies also carry genetic information and pass down traits throughout generations, much like their human counterparts. The traits can then be studied through different Drosophila lineages and the findings can be applied to deduce genetic trends in humans. Research conducted on Drosophila help determine the ground rules for transmission of genes in many organisms. Drosophila is a useful in vivo tool to analyze Alzheimer's disease. Rhomboid proteases were first detected in Drosophila but then found to be highly conserved across eukaryotes, mitochondria, and bacteria. Melanin's ability to protect DNA against ionizing radiation has been most extensively demonstrated in Drosophila, including in the formative study by Hopwood et al 1985.

Microbiome
Like other animals, Drosophila is associated with various bacteria in its gut. The fly gut microbiota or microbiome seems to have a central influence on Drosophila fitness and life history characteristics. The microbiota in the gut of Drosophila represents an active current research field.

Drosophila species also harbour vertically transmitted endosymbionts, such as Wolbachia and Spiroplasma. These endosymbionts can act as reproductive manipulators, such as cytoplasmic incompatibility induced by Wolbachia or male-killing induced by the D. melanogaster Spiroplasma poulsonii (named MSRO). The male-killing factor of the D. melanogaster MSRO strain was discovered in 2018, solving a decades-old mystery of the cause of male-killing. This represents the first bacterial factor that affects eukaryotic cells in a sex-specific fashion, and is the first mechanism identified for male-killing phenotypes. Alternatively, they may protect theirs hosts from infection. Drosophila Wolbachia can reduce viral loads upon infection, and is explored as a mechanism of controlling viral diseases (e.g. Dengue fever) by transferring these Wolbachia to disease-vector mosquitoes. The S. poulsonii strain of Drosophila neotestacea protects its host from parasitic wasps and nematodes using toxins that preferentially attack the parasites instead of the host.

Since the Drosophila species is one of the most used model organisms, it was vastly used in genetics. However, the effect abiotic factors, such as temperature, has on the microbiome on Drosophila species has recently been of great interest. Certain variations in temperature have an impact on the microbiome. It was observed that higher temperatures (31°C) lead to an increase of Acetobacter populations in the gut microbiome of Drosophila melanogaster as compared to lower temperatures (13°C). In low temperatures (13°C), the flies were more cold resistant and also had the highest concentration of Wolbachia.

The microbiome in the gut can also be transplanted among organisms. It was found that Drosophila melanogaster  became more cold-tolerant when the gut microbiota from Drosophila melanogaster that were reared at low temperatures. This depicted that the gut microbiome is correlated to physiological processes.

Moreover, the microbiome plays a role in aggression, immunity, egg-laying preferences, locomotion and metabolism. As for aggression, it plays a role to a certain degree during courtship. It was observed that germ-free flies were not as competitive compared to the wild-type males. Microbiome of the Drosophila species is also known to promote aggression by octopamine OA signalling. The microbiome has been shown to impact these fruit flies' social interactions, specifically aggressive behaviour that is seen during courtship and mating.

Predators
Drosophila species are prey for many generalist predators, such as robber flies. In Hawaii, the introduction of yellowjackets from mainland United States has led to the decline of many of the larger species. The larvae are preyed on by other fly larvae, staphylinid beetles, and ants.

Neurochemistry
As with many Eukaryotes, this genus is known to express SNAREs, and as with several others the components of the SNARE complex are known to be somewhat substitutable: Although the loss of SNAP-25 - a component of neuronal SNAREs - is lethal, SNAP-24 can fully replace it. For another example, an R-SNARE not normally found in synapses can substitute for synaptobrevin.

Immunity
The Spätzle protein is a ligand of Toll. In addition to melanin's more commonly known roles in the endoskeleton and in neurochemistry, melanization is one step in the immune responses to some pathogens. Dudzic et al 2019 additionally find a large number of shared serine protease messengers between Spätzle/Toll and melanization and a large amount of crosstalk between these pathways.

Systematics

The genus Drosophila as currently defined is paraphyletic (see below) and contains 1,450 described species, while the total number of species is estimated at thousands. The majority of the species are members of two subgenera: Drosophila (about 1,100 species) and Sophophora (including D. (S.) melanogaster; around 330 species).

The Hawaiian species of Drosophila (estimated to be more than 500, with roughly 380 species described) are sometimes recognized as a separate genus or subgenus, Idiomyia, but this is not widely accepted. About 250 species are part of the genus Scaptomyza, which arose from the Hawaiian Drosophila and later recolonized continental areas.

Evidence from phylogenetic studies suggests these genera arose from within the genus Drosophila:
Liodrosophila Duda, 1922
Mycodrosophila Oldenburg, 1914
Samoaia Malloch, 1934
Scaptomyza Hardy, 1849
Zaprionus Coquillett, 1901
Zygothrica Wiedemann, 1830
Hirtodrosophila Duda, 1923 (position uncertain)

Several of the subgeneric and generic names are based on anagrams of Drosophila, including Dorsilopha, Lordiphosa, Siphlodora, Phloridosa, and Psilodorha.

Genetics
Drosophila species are extensively used as model organisms in genetics (including population genetics), cell biology, biochemistry, and especially developmental biology. Therefore, extensive efforts are made to sequence drosphilid genomes. The genomes of these species have been fully sequenced:
Drosophila (Sophophora) melanogaster
Drosophila (Sophophora) simulans
Drosophila (Sophophora) sechellia
Drosophila (Sophophora) yakuba
Drosophila (Sophophora) erecta
Drosophila (Sophophora) ananassae
Drosophila (Sophophora) pseudoobscura
Drosophila (Sophophora) persimilis
Drosophila (Sophophora) willistoni
Drosophila (Drosophila) mojavensis
Drosophila (Drosophila) virilis
Drosophila (Drosophila) grimshawi

The data have been used for many purposes, including evolutionary genome comparisons. D. simulans and D. sechellia are sister species, and provide viable offspring when crossed, while D. melanogaster and D. simulans produce infertile hybrid offspring. The Drosophila genome is often compared with the genomes of more distantly related species such as the honeybee Apis mellifera or the mosquito Anopheles gambiae.

The modEncode consortium is currently sequencing eight more Drosophila genomes, and even more genomes are being sequenced by the i5K consortium.

Curated data are available at FlyBase.

The   led by Andrew G. Clark, Michael Eisen, Douglas Smith, Casey Bergman, Brian Oliver, Therese Ann Markow, Thomas Kaufman, Manolis Kellis, William Gelbart, Venky Iyer, Daniel Pollard, Timothy Sackton, Amanda Larracuente, Nadia Singh, and including Wojciech Makalowski, Mohamed Noor, Temple F. Smith, Craig Venter, Peter Keightley, and Leonid Boguslavsky among its contributors  presents ten new genomes and combines those with previously released genomes for D. melanogaster and D. pseudoobscura to analyse the evolutionary history and common genomic structure of the genus. This includes the discovery of transposable elements and illumination of their evolutionary history. Bartolomé et al 2009 find at least  of the TEs in D. melanogaster, D. simulans and D. yakuba have been acquired by horizontal transfer. Bartolomé also finds HT TEs follow other relatedness metrics, with D. melanogaster⇔D. simulans events being twice as common as either of them ⇔ D. yakuba.

See also 
Drosophila hybrid sterility
Laboratory experiments of speciation
List of Drosophila species
Caenorhabditis 'Drosophilae' species supergroup, a group of species generally found on rotten fruits and transported by Drosophila flies

References

External links 

  FlyBase is a comprehensive database for information on the genetics and molecular biology of Drosophila. It includes data from the Drosophila Genome Projects and data curated from the literature.
  is an integrated database of genomic, expression and protein data for Drosophila
 University of California, Santa Cruz
 
  breeds hundreds of species and supplies them to researchers
 Lawrence Berkeley National Laboratory
 
 
 
 
  is library of Drosophila on the web
 
  – In India microinjection service for the generation of transgenic lines, Screening Platforms, Drosophila strain development

 
Drosophilidae genera
Taxa named by Carl Fredrik Fallén
Animal models